Mount Ulysses, is the highest mountain in the Muskwa Ranges of the Northern Canadian Rockies in British Columbia. It and neighbouring peaks are part of a group of names drawing on the epic poem The Odyssey, in which here Ulysses wanders for 10 years before being able to return home to Ithaca.

It was first climbed in 1961.

See also
 List of the most prominent summits of North America
 Highest mountain peaks of Canada

References

External links

"Ulysses Mountain, British Columbia" on Peakbagger

Three-thousanders of British Columbia
Canadian Rockies
Northern Interior of British Columbia
Peace River Land District